Baugy is a commune in the Cher department in the Centre-Val de Loire region of central France. On 1 January 2019, the former communes Laverdines and Saligny-le-Vif were merged into Baugy.

Geography

Population

Sights
 The church of St.Martin, dating from the twelfth century.
 Vestiges of Roman occupation.
 Ruins of a ninth-century castle.
 A feudal motte at Montifaut.

See also
Communes of the Cher department

References

Communes of Cher (department)
Berry, France